The Bietenhorn is a mountain of the Bernese Alps, located north of Mürren in the Bernese Oberland. It lies north-east of the Schilthorn, on the range between the Soustal and the main Lauterbrunnen valley.

See also
List of mountains of Switzerland

References

External links

 Bietenhorn on Hikr

Mountains of the Alps
Bernese Alps